Glencoe High School is a public secondary school in Glencoe, Oklahoma, United States. It is located at 201 East Lone Chimney Road in Glencoe, Oklahoma and the only high school in Glencoe Public Schools.

Extracurricular activities

Clubs and organizations

4-H
FCA
FFA
National Honor Society
Quiz Bowl
Student Council
SWAT
Yearbook

Athletics
Baseball
Basketball
Softball

References

External links
 

Public high schools in Oklahoma
Schools in Payne County, Oklahoma